The Zion Union Heritage Museum is a museum dedicated to African American and Cape Verdean American history that is located in Hyannis, Massachusetts. It opened in 2008.

References

External links

African-American museums in Massachusetts
Barnstable, Massachusetts